The 2018 IIHF Women's World Championship Division II was three international ice hockey tournaments organised by the International Ice Hockey Federation. The Division II Group A tournament was played in Maribor, Slovenia, from 31 March to 6 April 2018, the Division II Group B tournament was played in Valdemoro, Spain, from 17 to 23 March 2018, and the Division II Group B Qualification tournament was played in Sofia, Bulgaria, from 4 to 9 December 2017.

The Netherlands won the Division II Group A tournament and will play in Division I next year. Spain took home the top spot in the Division II Group B tournament and were promoted to Division II Group A for next year, while Croatia won the Division II Group B Qualification tournament.

Division II Group A

Participants

Match officials
4 referees and 7 linesmen were selected for the tournament.

Referees
 Darja Abrosimova
 Kaylen Erchul
 Anniina Nurmi
 Ulrike Winklmayr

Linesmen
 Liv Andersson
 Jennifer Berezowski
 Zita Gebora
 Catherine Goutama
 Anastasiia Kurashova
 Milla Ronkainen
 Wang Hui

Final standings

Results
All times are local (UTC+2).

Awards and statistics

Awards
Best players selected by the directorate:
Best Goalkeeper:  Pia Dukarič
Best Defenseman:  Kayleigh Hamers
Best Forward:  Pia Pren
Source: IIHF.com

Scoring leaders
List shows the top skaters sorted by points, then goals.

GP = Games played; G = Goals; A = Assists; Pts = Points; +/− = Plus/minus; PIM = Penalties in minutes; POS = Position
Source: IIHF.com

Leading goaltenders
Only the top five goaltenders, based on save percentage, who have played at least 40% of their team's minutes, are included in this list.

TOI = Time on Ice (minutes:seconds); SA = Shots against; GA = Goals against; GAA = Goals against average; Sv% = Save percentage; SO = Shutouts
Source: IIHF.com

Division II Group B

Participants

Match officials
4 referees and 7 linesmen were selected for the tournament.

Referees
 Sintija Čamāne
 Lisa Grison
 Elise Harbitz-Rasmussen
 Liu Chunhua

Linesmen
 Bettina Angerer
 Alba Calero
 Jennifer Cameron
 Claudia de la Pompa
 Fu Zhennan
 Loise Larsen
 Linnea Sainio

Final standings

Results
All times are local (UTC+1).

Awards and statistics

Awards
Best players selected by the directorate:
Best Goalkeeper:  Alba Gonzalo
Best Defenseman:  Elena Álvarez
Best Forward:  Silvia Björgvinsdóttir
Source: IIHF.com

Scoring leaders
List shows the top skaters sorted by points, then goals.

GP = Games played; G = Goals; A = Assists; Pts = Points; +/− = Plus/minus; PIM = Penalties in minutes; POS = Position
Source: IIHF.com

Leading goaltenders
Only the top five goaltenders, based on save percentage, who have played at least 40% of their team's minutes, are included in this list.

TOI = Time on Ice (minutes:seconds); SA = Shots against; GA = Goals against; GAA = Goals against average; Sv% = Save percentage; SO = Shutouts
Source: IIHF.com

Division II Group B Qualification

Participants

Match officials
3 referees and 5 linesmen were selected for the tournament.

Referees
 Olga Steinberg
 Maria Fuhrberg
 Michaela Matejova

Linesmen
 Yvonne Grascher
 Vitaliya Khamitsevich
 Julia Mannlein
 Tatiana Kasášová
 Ìlksen Șermin Özdemir

Final standings

Results
All times are local (UTC+2).

Statistics

Scoring leaders
List shows the top skaters sorted by points, then goals.

GP = Games played; G = Goals; A = Assists; Pts = Points; +/− = Plus/minus; PIM = Penalties in minutes; POS = Position
Source: IIHF.com

Leading goaltenders
Only the top five goaltenders, based on save percentage, who have played at least 40% of their team's minutes, are included in this list.

TOI = Time on Ice (minutes:seconds); SA = Shots against; GA = Goals against; GAA = Goals against average; Sv% = Save percentage; SO = Shutouts
Source: IIHF.com

References

External links
Official website of IIHF

2018
Division II
2018 IIHF World Championship Division II
2018 IIHF World Championship Division II
2018 IIHF World Championship Division II
2017 in Bulgarian women's sport
2018 in Slovenian women's sport
2018 in Spanish women's sport
Sports competitions in Sofia
Sport in Maribor
Sport in the Community of Madrid
December 2017 sports events in Europe
March 2018 sports events in Europe
April 2018 sports events in Europe